Zainab Al-Askari (born February 6, 1974) is a Bahraini actress, screenwriter, producer, spokesmodel, and model popular in the Persian Gulf region. She retired from performing in 2009.

Career
She has starred in and produced several shows for television before she retired in a later time.  Although a Bahraini national who has acted in several Bahraini productions, she has appeared as one of the main characters in several Kuwaiti and Saudi Arabian TV shows as well, she is also a spokesmodel for Parachute in the Persian Gulf region. Her most recent role was as Huda in the Bahraini television show Hudu'u wa Awasif (Silence and Storms), in which she plays a confused and tragic beauty who cannot decide between the true love of her life, a poor yet passionate man who cannot live without her, and her boss.  Although she decides to marry her boss, a stance that will render her socially secure, she is plagued with guilt about the life that she has left behind and experiences brief encounters with her true love.  Meanwhile, the family she has abandoned is falling apart; her father is steeped in illness and her sister is falling into the dangerous business of prostitution.  In the end, very few of the conflicts are resolved.  Her father dies as a result of his discovery of his daughter's prostitution and her sister, the prostitute, is haunted by visions of her father and later becomes insane.  Huda herself becomes tragically ill at the conclusion the series and dies.  At her deathbed sat her husband whilst her true love peered in from the square window on the door.  As she slowly descends into oblivion, she mutters "I am a bird and so I cannot be caged, I must be free so that all can love me". With this, Huda dies and the show ends.

In 2005, she appeared in Athary; a series about a kind young girl who faces many challenges in her life that determine her fate. Athary was the first series of Zainab Al Askari's own production company (Bint El-Mamlaka). She was selected the best actress in a gulf series in 2005 for her role in Athary.
Her last appearance was in the Best gulf series in 2006: Bela Rahma (Without Mercy); a story of a rich beautiful woman; (Fajer) living with her little sister (Wedd) who suffers from Down Syndrome, and her struggle with her addicted cousin (Jassim) to live a peaceful life. Bela Rahma was selected the best gulf series in 2006, and Zainab Al Askari was also selected the best actress for her role for the second time.

The next two projects for Zainab Al Askari's are La'Anat Emra'Ah (A Woman's Curse) and Lahthat Tho'Of (A Moment of Weakness).

Work

Television series

Theatre

Screenwriting

References

External links
 Zainab Al Askari information site (Arabic and English) 
 El Cinema page

Bahraini women writers
Bahraini television actresses
Bahraini female models
1974 births
Living people
21st-century actresses